= Puraman Bhawan =

Puraman Bhawan Puraman Bhavan
- village
- Location within Madhya Pradesh Location within India
- Coordinates: 23.3358849°N 77.4146128°E
- Country: India
- State: Madhya Pradesh
- District: Bhopal
- Tehsil: Huzur
- Elevation: 486 m (1,594 ft)

Population (2011)
  - Total: 271
- Time zone: UTC+5:30 (IST)
- ISO 3166 code: MP-IN
- 2011 census code: 482453

Puraman Bhawan is a village in the Bhopal district of Madhya Pradesh, India. It is located in the Huzur tehsil and the Phanda block.

== Demographics ==
According to the 2011 census of India, Puraman Bhawan has 57 households. The effective literacy rate (i.e. the literacy rate of population excluding children aged 6 and below) is 76.32%.

Demographics (2011 Census)
	Total	Male	Female
Population	271	134	137
Children aged below 6 years	43	19	24
Scheduled caste	16	8	8
Scheduled tribe	0	0	0
Literates	174	94	80
Workers (all)	184	98	86
Main workers (total)	105	62	43
Main workers: Cultivators	66	38	28
Main workers: Agricultural labourers	33	20	13
Main workers: Household industry workers	0	0	0
Main workers: Other	6	4	2
Marginal workers (total)	79	36	43
Marginal workers: Cultivators	41	20	21
Marginal workers: Agricultural labourers	38	16	22
Marginal workers: Household industry workers	0	0	0
Marginal workers: Others	0	0	0
Non-workers	87	36	51
